This article lists events that occurred during 1969 in Estonia.

Incumbents
Johannes Käbin

Events
Pirita Velodrome was opened.

Births
30 December – Kersti Kaljulaid, politician, 5th President of Estonia

Deaths
25 October – Ellinor Aiki, painter (b. 1893)

References

 
1960s in Estonia
Estonia
Estonia
Years of the 20th century in Estonia